Thomas R. King (July 13, 1942 – April 23, 2011) was an American songwriter, guitarist, and arranger. He founded the 1960s rock band The Outsiders, and co-wrote the band's biggest hit song, "Time Won't Let Me".

Life and career
Born in Cleveland, Ohio, King attended East Cleveland's Shaw High School in the late 1950s. He formed The Starfires, also known as Tom King & the Starfires, at the age of 15. He formed the rock band The Outsiders in 1965, as a continuation of The Starfires. King co-wrote the band's 1966 hit "Time Won't Let Me", from the album of the same name, with brother-in-law Chet Kelley. The song spent 15 weeks on the Billboard Hot 100 chart, peaking at No. 5, and selling over a million copies. Iggy Pop redid the song on his album Party in 1981, then The Smithereens also had a hit with the song, remaking it in 1994. King won a BMI award for the song having been played on the radio over four million times.

King died at a nursing home in Wickliffe, Ohio on April 23, 2011 at the age of 68. He suffered from congestive heart failure.

References

1942 births
2011 deaths
American rock songwriters
American rock guitarists
American male guitarists
American rock singers
American male singer-songwriters
Musicians from Cleveland
Singer-songwriters from Ohio
Guitarists from Ohio
20th-century American guitarists
20th-century American male musicians